Mörlunda is a locality situated in Hultsfred Municipality, Kalmar County, Sweden with 838 inhabitants in 2010.

It gave its name to a community in Greenbrier County, West Virginia. The name means "wooded marsh", a fitting description for its surroundings.

References 

Populated places in Kalmar County
Populated places in Hultsfred Municipality